Omar Moussa may refer to:

 Omar Moussa (athlete) (born 1961), Djiboutian long-distance runner
 Omar Moussa (footballer) (born 1997), Burundian football player